Bagh Dushkhel (Urdu&pashto: باغدوشخیل) is a union council in Lower Dir District, Khyber Pakhtunkhwa, Pakistan.

The village is located on 34°43'45.1"N 71°48'00.9"E approximately 1050 meters above the sea level. The people of Bagh, Otala, Katon, Chenaruno, and subvillages Near Bagh are known as Dushkhel. It is said that the word Dushkhel is likely to be derived from a man by the name Dost Muhammad Khan who was the ancestor of these villagers. The name changed from Dostkhel to Dushkhel over time. Although it is not confirmed.

Neighboring Villages 
The Neighboring villages of Bagh Dushkhel include Katon, Otala, Pingal, Chenaruno, Guroh, and Doda. Katon lies to Southeast of Bagh Dushkel, Otala and Pingal towards South, Chenaruno to its East, Goroh towards North and Doda towards Northwest.

Neighboring Cities 
Timergara and Ziarat Talash are the major cities near Bagh Dushkhel. Among these two, although, Timergara is large and most facilitated city but Talash is most visited by the villagers every day.

Education 
Bagh Dushkhel is one of the prosperous towns in Lower Dir. Many have government jobs, and more than 70% are educated. The village has a Higher Secondary school for males which is recently upgraded from High School. Though, female education is limited to High school only (which is, also, upgraded from middle school) . For primary education there are two schools for boys and one for girls.

Islamic Education is also on rise. Both Females and males have full facility.

Farming 
Just like any village Bagh Dushkhel has people who earn their livings through farming. Few years Back, Farming was the main source of income for most of the people but due to overpopulation the suitable areas for farming are now covered with houses. As most people are now doing Government jobs so they do not consider Farming as the main source of their income.

A second gateway 
Bagh Dushkhel's road joins lower Dir district with Malakand district. It can be used as an alternative way to Chakdara road.

Mountains 
The village is surrounded by two mountains, one is Ser Mano (سرماڼو) which is to the west of the village and is 1400 meters high above the sea level. Bashe manzai (باشې منزۍ) is to the east of the village.

See also 

 Lower Dir District

External links
Khyber-Pakhtunkhwa Government website section on Lower Dir
United Nations

Lower Dir District
Union Councils of Lower Dir District